Paul T. Johnson (born April 26, 1958)  is a retired major general in the United States Air Force. He was commander of the 355th Fighter Wing and 451st Air Expeditionary Wing, and has served in Operation Desert Storm, Operation Northern Watch, and Operation Enduring Freedom. He was commissioned as a 2nd lieutenant in May 1985. He received the Air Force Cross for rescuing a stranded U.S. Navy pilot, Lieutenant Devon Jones.

Air Force Cross

His citation reads:

References

External links
 
 

 

1958 births
Living people
United States Air Force personnel of the Gulf War
United States Air Force personnel of the Iraq War
People from Gadsden, Alabama
Recipients of the Air Force Cross (United States)
Recipients of the Distinguished Flying Cross (United States)
Recipients of the Legion of Merit
United States Air Force generals